

Alive 

Emami, Mohammad  (b. 1931)
Khorasani, Hossein Vahid  (b. 1921)
Hamedani, Hossein Noori  (b. 1925)
Rohani, Sadeq  (b. 1926)
Jannati, Ahmad  (b. 1927)
Mousa Shubairi Zanjani (b. 1927)
Naser Makarem Shirazi (b. 1927)
al-Fayyad, Mohammad Ishaq  (b. 1930)
al-Sistani, Ali  (b. 1930)
al-Qazwini, Mortada (b. 1931) 
Najafi, Mohammad Hussain  (b. 1932)
Jannaati, Mohammad Ebrahim  (b. 1933)
Ostadi, Reza (b. 1937) 
al-Haeri, Kazem  (b. 1938)
Khamenei, Ali  (b. 1939)
Najafi, Bashir (b. 1942)
Shirazi, Sadiq  (b. 1942)
al-Tijani, Mohammad (b. 1943)
al-Kourani, Ali  (b. 1944)
Nateq-Nouri, Ali Akbar  (b. 1944)
al-Modarresi, Muhammad Taqi (b. 1945)
Fallahian, Ali  (b. 1945)
Khoeiniha, Mohammad (b. 1945) 
Moezi, Abdolhossein  (b. 1945)
Reyshahri, Mohammad (b. 1946) 
al-Modarresi, Hadi  (b. 1948) 
Rouhani, Hassan  (b. 1948)
Shooshtari, Mohammad Ismaeil  (b. 1949) 
Dorri-Najafabadi, Ghorbanali  (b. 1950)
Noori, Abdollah  (b. 1950)
Naqvi, Jawad  (b. 1952)
Ansari, Majid (b. 1954)
Mousavi-Lari, Abdolvahed  (b. 1954)
Younesi, Ali  (b. 1955)
Araki, Mohsen  (b. 1956)
Mohseni-Ejehei, Gholam Hossein  (b. 1956)
Bagheri, Khosrow  (b. 1957)
Boroujerdi, Hossein Kazemeyni  (b. 1958)
Mohsen Kadivar (b. 1959)
Abtahi, Mohammad Ali  (b. 1960)
Khatami, Ahmad  (b. 1960)
Mostafa Pour-Mohammadi (b. 1960) 
Nassab, Reza Hosseini (b. 1960) 
Yaqubi, Mohammad (b. 1960) 
Bukhari, Fida Hussain (b. 1961) 
Leghaei, Mansour (b. 1962) 
al-Gharavi, Aqeel (b. 1964)
Salman, Ali  (b. 1965)
Naqvi, Ali Naqi  (b. 1970)
Hasan, Hamidul 
Masoumi-Tehrani, Abdol-Hamid
Sane'i, Hassan
al-Saghir, Jalal al-Din Ali

Deceased
An incomplete list of Shia Muslim scholars listed based on the century in which they were born;

7th century
Sulaym ibn Qays al-Hilālī al-ʿĀmirī (died c.695)
Sa'īd b. Jubayr b. Hishām al-Asadī al-Wālibī (665-714)
Asim b. Bahdala Abi l-Najud al-Asadi al-Kufi (b. between 661-680, died 744-746)
Abān b. Abī ʿAyyāsh (Fīrūz) al-Baṣrī al-Tābiʿī, known as Aban b. Abi 'Ayyash (died 746-757)
Abū Saʿīd Abān b. Rubāḥ al-Bakrī al-Jurayrī al-Kindī al-Rabaʿī al-Kūfī, known as Aban b. Taghlib (died c.758)
Sulayman b. Mihran al-A'mash al-Kufi, known as A'mash Kufi (680-c.765)
Zurāra b. Aʿyan b. Sunsun al-Shaybānī al-Kūfī, known as Zurara b. A'yan (c.690 - c.767)
Maʿrūf b. Kharrabūdh (b. in the second half of the seventh century)
Al-Fudayl b. Yasar al-Nahdi al-Basri, known as Al-Nahdi (b. in the late seventh century)

8th century
Abu Mikhnaf (died 774)
Ja'far al-Sadiq (700-765)
Burayd b. Muʿāwiya al-ʿIjlī (died before 765)
Jabir ibn Hayyan
al-Thumali, Abu Hamzah (d. 767)
Yahya b. Abi l-Qasim al-Asadi, known as Abu Basir al-Asadi (died 767)
Muḥammad b. Muslim al-Thaqafī al-Kūfī (died 767)
Sufyan al-Thawri (716–778)
Sufyan ibn ʽUyaynah (725-814)
Abū Mūsā Jābir ibn Hayyān (c.721 – c.815)
Yunus b. 'Abd al-Rahman (723-819)
Al-Waqidi (c. 747-823)
Ṣafwān b. Yaḥyā al-Bajalī (died 825)
Abū Aḥmad Muḥammad b. Abī ʿUmayr b. Zīyad b. ʿĪsā al-Azdī (died 832)
Ahmad b. Muhammad b. Abi Nasr al-Bazanti (769-836)
Hasan b. Mahbub (766-839)
Al-Ḥasan b. ʿAlī b. Faḍḍāl al-Taymulī al-Kūfī (died 839)
Al-Sayyid ʿAbd al-ʿAẓīm al-Ḥasanī, known as Sayyid al-Karīm and Shah ʿAbd al-ʿAzīm (789-866)
ʿAlī b. Mahziyār al-Ahwāzī al-Dawraqī (b. in the middle of the 8th century)
Faddala b. Ayyub al-Azdi al-Ahwazi (b. in the middle of the 8th century)

9th century
Abu 'Ali Hasan b. 'Arafa al-'Abdi al-Baghdadi (died 870)
Abū Muḥammad Faḍl b. Shādhān b. Khalīl al-Azdī al-Nīshābūrī (died 873)
Fadl b. Shadhan b. Khalil al-Azdi (died 873)
Al-Kindi (died 873)
Abū Isḥāq Ibrāhīm b. Mahzīyār al-Ahwāzī (c.811 - c.879)
Abu Ja'far Muhammad b. 'Abd al-Malik al-Daqiqi al-Wasiti (died 879)
Fatima al-Fihri (died 880)
Ahmad b. Muhammad b. Isa al-Ash'ari (died c. 890)
Abu Hatam Muhammad b. Idris al-Razi (died 890)
Ahmad b. Muhammad b. Khalid al-Barqi (c.815 - c.887/894)
Ya'qubi (died 898)
Ahmad ibn A'tham (died 926)
Qummi, Ali ibn Babwayh (died c.940)
al-Kulayni, Muhammad ibn Ya‘qub (864-941)
Al-Farabi (c.872-950)
Muhammad b. 'Umar al-Kashshi (died c. 951)
Muhammad b. al-Hasan b. Ahmad, known as Ibn al-Walid al-Qummi (c.883-954)
Al-Masudi (c. 896–956)
Muhammad b. Yahya al-'Attar al-Qummi (lived late of ninth century until the half of the tenth century)
Ali b. Ibrahim al-Qummi (lived during the second half of the ninth and beginning of tenth centuries)
ʿAbd Allāh b. Jaʿfar al-Ḥimyarī (lived in 9th century)
Sa'd b. 'Abd Allah al-Ash'ari al-Qummi (lived in 9th century)
Husayn b. Sa'id al-Ahwazi (b. before 817-868)

10th century

Abu Muhammad Harun b. Musa b. Ahmad al-Talla'ukbari (b. c.900)
Ibn Qulawayh (died c. 979)
Ibn Babwayh (Shaykh al-Saduq) (923-991)
Ibn al-Nadim (died c. 995)
Al-Sharif al-Radi (970–1015)
Muhammad al-Baghdadi (Shaykh al-Mufid) (948–1022)
Ahmad b. 'Abd al-Wahid b. Ahmad, known as Ibn Hashir (d.1032)
Abu Noaym Ahámad b. Abdallah Esfahani (d. 1038 AD)
Sharif al-Murtaza (965–1044)
Ahmad ibn Ali al-Najashi (982-1058)
Tusi, Abu Ja‘far (995–1067)
Ibn Jonayd Eskafi (b. 902)
Muhammad b. Mas'ud al-'Ayyashi Sullami Samarqandi (lived in 10th century)

11th century

Aḥmad Ibn ʿAyyāsh al-Jawharī (d. 1010)
Muḥammad al-Sharīf al-Raḍī, (al-Sayyid al-Raḍī) (d. 1015)
Muḥammad al-Qummī (Ibn Shādhān) (d. 1029)
al-Tabarsi, Fadhl ibn Hasan (1093–1153)
Ashub, Ibn Shahr (1095-1192)

12th century

Abū al-Wafā Abd al-Jabbār al-Rāzī (d. 1110)
Abū al-Ḥasan Alī al-Fanjkirdī al-Nayshābūrī (d. 1119)
Abū ʿAlī al-Ḥasan al-Ṭūsī (d. 1121)
Abū Manṣūr Aḥmad al-Ṭabrisī (author of al-Iḥtijāj) (d. 1192)
Sayyed Ibn Tawus (1193–1266)

13th century

Tusi, Nasir al-Din (1201–1274)
Muhaqqiq al-Hilli (c.1205–1277)
al-Bahrani, Maytham (1238–1299)
al-Hilli, Jamal al-Din Hasan (Allamah) (1250–1325)

14th century

 Khalīfa al-Māzandarānī (d. 1335)
 Amīd al-Dīn al-A'rajī (d. 1353)
 Naṣīr al-Dīn al-Kāshī (d. 1354)
 Muḥammad al-Ḥillī (Fakhr al-Muḥaqqiqīn) (d. 1369)

15th century

 Izz al-Dīn Abū Muḥammad al-Ḥasan al-Āmilī (d. 1399)
 Ḥāfiẓ Rajab Bursī (d. 1410)
 Jamāl al-Dīn al-Baḥrānī (Ibn al-Mutawwaj) (d. 1416)
 Zayn al-Dīn Abū Muḥammad Alī (Ṣāḥib al-Ṣirāṭ al-mustaqīm) (d. 1472)

16th century 

Asterabadi, Muhammad Baqir (Mir Damad) (d. 1631)
Shirazi, Sadr al-Din Muhammad (Mullah Sadra) (1571–1640)
al-Majlisi, Muhammad Taqi (Al-Majlisi al-Awwal) (1594–1660)

17th century

al-Majlisi, Muhammad Baqir (Allamah) (1616–1689)
al-Āmili, Hur (1624–1693)
al-Jaza'iri, Ni'matullah (1640–1700)
al-Samahiji, Abdullah (1675–1723)
al-Haeri, Nasrallah (1696–1746)
al-Bahrani, Yusuf (1695–1772)

18th century
Behbahani, Muhammad Baqir (1706–1792)

19th century
al-Ansari, Murtada (d. 1864)
Musavi, Hamid Husayn (1830 - 1880)
Shirazi, Abdullah (1892–1984)
Tabrizi, Mir-Fatah-Agha (??-1892)
Shirazi, Mirza Hasan (1814–1896)
Khorasani, Muhammad Kazim (1839–1911)
al-Sadr, Ismail (??-1920)
al-Sadr, Haydar (1891–1937)
Modarres, Hasan (1870–1937)
Yazdi, Abdul Karim Haeri (1859–1937)
Hasan, Najmul (1863–1938)
Esfahani, Muhammad Hossein Qaravi (1879–1942)
Roshdieh, Hasan (1851–1944)
Yusuf Ali, Abdullah (1872–1953)
Kashani, Abul Qasim (1884–1961)
Borujerdi, Husayn (1875–1962)
al-Hakim, Muhsin (1889–1970)
Shirazi, Sultanu'l-Wa'izin (1894–1971)
Yazdi, Mahdi Puya (1899–1973)
Tabatabaei, Muhammad Husayn (1892–1981)
Naqvi, Najafi, Syed Safdar Hussain (1932–1989)
al-Khoei, Abul Qasim (1899–1992)
Golpaygani, Muhammad Reza (1898–1993)
Araki, Muhammad Ali (1895–1994)
Arbab, Rahim (1874-??)
ibn Salih, Sadr al-Din (1848-??)

20th century
al-Sadr, Sadr al-Din (1882–1954)
Rizvi, Ahmad (1901–1964)
Rizvi, Mohsin Nawab (1911–1969)
Amini, Abdul Hosein (1902-1970)
Turabi, Allamah Rasheed (1908–1973)
al-Sadr, Musa (1929–1978)
Taleghani, Mahmoud (1911–1979)
Motahhari, Morteza (1920–1979)
al-Sadr, Muhammad Baqir (1935–1980)
Beheshti, Muhammad (1928–1981)
Bahonar, Muhammad Javad (1933–1981)
Shariatmadari, Kazem (1904–1985)
Naqvi, Kalbe Abid (1923-1986)
Naqvi, Ali Naqi (1905–1988)
Khomeini, Ruhullah (1900–1989)
al-Musawi, Abbas (1952–1992)
Naqvi, Aqa Hasan (1935-1996)
al-Sadr, Muhammad Muhammad Sadiq (1943–1999)
Jawadi, Syed Zeeshan Haider (1938-2000)
Shamseddine, Muhammad Mehdi (1936–2001)
Shirazi, Muhammad (1928–2001)
Rizvi, Sa'id Akhtar (1927–2002)
Rizvi, Syed Ali Akhtar (1948–2002)
Khalkhali, Sadegh (1927–2003)
al-Hakim, Muhammad Baqir (1939–2003)
al-Khoei, Abdul Majid (1962–2003)
al-Waeli, Ahmed (1928–2003)
Abaee-Khurasani, Muhammad Va'ez (1940–2004)
al-Jamri, Abdul Amir (1937–2006)
Ansari, Mustafa Hussain (1945-2006)
Tabrizi, Mirza Javad  (1926–2006)
'Askari, Murtada Sharif (1914–2007)
Lankarani, Muhammad Fazel (1931–2007)
Tavassoli, Mohammad Reza (1931–2008)
al-Hakim, Abdul Aziz  (1952–2009)
Foumani, Muhammad Taghi Bahjat (1913–2009)
Montazeri, Hossein-Ali (1922–2009)
Fadhlullah, Muhammad Husayn (1935–2010)
Zanjani, Abbasali Amid (1937–2011)
Rezvani, Gholamreza (d. 2013)
Burhanuddin, Mohammed (1915-2014)
Mahdavi Kani, Mohammad Reza (1931-2014)
Bahr al-Ulloum, Mohammad (1923–2015)
Ardebili, Abdul Karim Mousavi (1926–2016)
Tabasi, Abbas Vaez (1935–2016)
Aliari, Javad Gharavi  (1935-2018)
Jafri, Husain Mohammad (1923-2019)
Kabuli, Qurban Ali (1928–2019)
Shahroudi, Mohammad  (1925-2019)
Najafabadi Ibrahim Amini  (1925-2020)
Sadiq, Kalbe  (1939-2020)
Sanei, Yousef  (1937-2020)
Taskhiri, Mohammad-Ali (1944-2020)
Yazdi, Mohammad (1931-2020) 
al-Hakim, Mohammad Saeed  (1936-2021)
Mesbah Yazdi, Mohammad Taghi  (1934-2021)
Mohtashami-Pur, Ali Akbar  (1947-2021)
Naqvi, Kalbe Husayn
Golpaygani, Lotfollah Safi  (1919-2022)

 
Shia